The Mayo Civic Center is a multi-purpose convention center and event facility in Rochester, Minnesota.

The original building was built in 1938, as a gift to the city by Dr. Charles H. Mayo and Mayo Properties Association (now Mayo Clinic) and has been expanded and renovated several times over the years. It consists of a ballroom (40,000 sq. ft.) used for conferences and galas, an arena (5,200 seats) used for concerts, wrestling, and basketball, an auditorium (3,000 seats) used for concerts, performing arts, and sporting events, an exhibit hall for consumer shows and a theatre for the arts (1,084 fixed seat theatre). The Mayo Civic Center also has 23-meeting rooms/suites varying in size.

Mayo Park, a serene, 11-acre park, adjacent to the venue offers groups the opportunity to host outdoor events.

It was home to the Rochester Mustangs ice hockey team and various professional basketball franchises.

It is perhaps famous to music fans for being the shooting location for Bon Jovi's music video for 1986's "Wanted Dead or Alive".

Convention Center Expansion 
In 2017, the Mayo Civic Center nearly doubled in size by adding a convention center to its existing footprint. The $84 million expansion features a 40,000 sq. ft Ballroom (can divide into three sections), 16 meeting rooms/suites, and two-executive boardrooms. The expanded center hosts medical and technical conferences, large business meetings and healthcare summits.

Mayo Clinic 
The Mayo Civic Center acts as the main place for meeting and events of the Mayo Clinic, as it plays host to medical lectures and company gatherings.

Sports and Entertainment hosted

Professional wrestling events
The American Wrestling Association held a weekly television broadcast for both syndication, and cable on ESPN, from 1989-1990. Other promotions like World Championship Wrestling and Extreme Championship Wrestling also held shows here prior to their demise. The Civic Center recently has hosted World Wrestling Entertainment house shows with the WWE Raw, Smackdown and ECW appearing. TNA has hosted events here as well.

Other events
Notable events held the Civic Center are Disney Live, Elmo Live, Blue Man Group and other events. The Harlem Globetrotters and artists, such as KISS, Chris Young, Little Big Town, Sheryl Crow, Ladysmith Black Mambazo, Bob Dylan, Hinder, Celtic Woman & Disturbed, have performed in the arena. The Mayo Civic Auditorium is used for performing arts as well as concert events. Shows like "The Chocolate Factory" and 1940's Big Band Swing Revue "In the Mood" and other arts events have taken place here, as well as Broadway shows such as Rent.  Every two years, the University of Minnesota Marching Band performs its indoor concert at the venue in addition to its traditional series at Northrop Auditorium in Minneapolis.

It annually hosts the NYWA Youth Wrestling State Championships which is one of the biggest wrestling tournaments in the United States. It hosted the NCAA Women's Division II Basketball Championship in 2001 and 2002.

References

External links
 

1938 establishments in Minnesota
Buildings and structures in Rochester, Minnesota
Indoor arenas in Minnesota
Indoor ice hockey venues in Minnesota
Sports venues in Minnesota
Tourist attractions in Olmsted County, Minnesota
Continental Basketball Association venues